Matthew Ryan Meese (born October 10, 1983) is a sketch comedian and actor who is best known for his role as an actor, head writer, and co-creator of Studio C, a sketch comedy show produced by BYUtv.

Early life and education

Meese was born in New Jersey but raised in Phoenix, Arizona as the second of four children. After high school, Meese served as a missionary for the Church of Jesus Christ of Latter-day Saints in Chicago, Illinois, after which he attended and later graduated from BYU with an undergraduate degree in Psychology. Before and after his college graduation, he worked for the Monte L. Bean Life Science Museum for a total of five years.

Studio C

It was during his membership of BYU's on-campus sketch comedy group, Divine Comedy that Meese and other original members of Studio C first conceived the idea for the show. The show was not considered by BYUtv until Meese personally met with content director Jared Shores, his best friend, and pitched him the idea. Meese is acknowledged as one of the creators of Studio C and the show's head writer. Matt is known for many roles in his sketch comedy.

Meese's most well-known role is as Scott Sterling, an unlucky soccer and volleyball player who continually receives blows to the head and by doing so ultimately helps his team to victory. In terms of views, the Sterling series are the most successful sketches of Studio C, being the only Studio C videos to exceed 75 million views on YouTube.

As confirmed in August 2018, while Studio C had a 10th season, he and the other nine original cast members left after the 9th season to create and star in a new production company called JK! Studios. After sharing the news, he also expressed that he would like to do future guest spots for the show when the opportunity arises.

JK! Studios
Matthew stars in the new JK! Studios series “Freelancers” playing Ryan. Meese along with fellow JK! Studios cast members Mallory Everton, Stacey Harkey, Jason Gray, Natalie Madsen, and Jeremy Warner, participated in the first season of the televised comedy competition, Bring the Funny, making it all the way to the semi-finals.

Personal life 

Meese is colorblind.

Filmography

References

External links
 

Living people
1983 births
American Latter Day Saint writers
Brigham Young University alumni
American Mormon missionaries in the United States